Amsterdam is a hamlet within the Rural Municipality of Buchanan No. 304, Saskatchewan, Canada. Listed as a designated place by Statistics Canada, the hamlet had a population of 25 in the Canada 2016 Census. The hamlet is located 63.9 km north of the city of Yorkton and 1.5 km west of Highway 9. The community was founded at the turn of the 20th century by Dutch immigrants, hence the name. In its prime, the community had a post office, grain elevator, garage, and a school.  It, like many small towns, has been hit hard by the gradual trend toward urbanization.  The hamlet now has fewer than 25 people; most are of Ukrainian descent.

Demographics

See also

 List of communities in Saskatchewan
 Hamlets of Saskatchewan
 Block settlements

References

Buchanan No. 304, Saskatchewan
Designated places in Saskatchewan
Organized hamlets in Saskatchewan
Division No. 9, Saskatchewan